Copelatus tucuchiensis is a species of diving beetle. It is part of the subfamily Copelatinae, which belongs to the family Dytiscidae. Copelatus tucuchiensis has been described by Balfour-Browne in 1939.

References

tucuchiensis
Beetles described in 1939